Pentobarbital (previously known as pentobarbitone in Britain and Australia) is a short-acting barbiturate typically used as a sedative, a preanesthetic, and to control convulsions in emergencies. It can also be used for short-term treatment of insomnia but has been largely replaced by the benzodiazepine family of drugs.

In high doses, pentobarbital causes death by respiratory arrest. It is used for veterinary euthanasia and is used by some U.S. states and the U.S. federal government for executions of convicted criminals by lethal injection. In some countries and states, it is also used for physician-assisted suicide.

Pentobarbital was widely abused and sometimes known as "yellow jackets" due to the yellow capsule of the Nembutal brand. Pentobarbital in oral (pill) form is no longer commercially available.

Uses

Medical
Typical applications for pentobarbital are sedative, short term hypnotic, preanesthetic, insomnia treatment, and control of convulsions in emergencies. Abbott Pharmaceutical discontinued manufacture of their Nembutal brand of Pentobarbital capsules in 1999, largely replaced by the benzodiazepine family of drugs. They were available as 30, 50, and 100 mg capsules of yellow, white-orange, and yellow colors, respectively.

Pentobarbital can reduce intracranial pressure in Reye's syndrome, treat traumatic brain injury and induce coma in cerebral ischemia patients. Pentobarbital-induced coma has been advocated in patients with acute liver failure refractory to mannitol.

Pentobarbital is also used as a veterinary anesthetic agent.

Euthanasia 
Pentobarbital can cause death when used in high doses. It is used for euthanasia for humans as well as animals. It is taken alone, or in combination with complementary agents such as phenytoin, in commercial animal euthanasia injectable solutions.

In the Netherlands, it is part of the standard protocol for physician-assisted suicide for self-administration by the patient.

It is taken by mouth for physician-assisted death in the United States states of Oregon, Washington, Vermont, and California (as of January 2016). The oral dosage of pentobarbital indicated for physician-assisted suicide in Oregon is typically 10 g of liquid.

In Switzerland, sodium pentobarbital is administered to the patient intravenously. Once administered, sleep is induced within 30 seconds, and the heart stops beating within 3 minutes. Oral administration is also used. A Swiss pharmacist reported in 2022 that the dose for assisted suicide had been raised to 15 grams because with lower doses in some cases death was preceded by a coma of up to 10 hours.

Execution 
Pentobarbital has been used or considered as a substitute for the barbiturate sodium thiopental used for capital punishment by lethal injection in the United States when that drug became unavailable. In 2011 the U.S. manufacturer of sodium thiopental stopped production, and importation of the drug proved impossible. Pentobarbital was used in an U.S. execution for the first time in December 2010 in Oklahoma, as part of a three-drug protocol. In March 2011 pentobarbital was used for the first time as the sole drug in a U.S. execution, in Ohio. Since then several states as well as the federal government have used pentobarbital for lethal injections; some use three-drug protocols and others use pentobarbital alone.

Pentobarbital is produced by the Danish company Lundbeck. Use of the drug for executions is illegal under Danish law, and when this was discovered, after public outcry in Danish media, Lundbeck stopped selling it to US states that impose the death penalty and prohibited US distributors to sell it to any customers, such as state authorities, that practice or participate in executions of humans.

Texas began using the single-drug pentobarbital protocol for executing death-row inmates on July 18, 2012, because of a shortage of pancuronium bromide, a muscle paralytic previously used as one component of a three-drug cocktail. In October 2013, Missouri changed its protocol to allow for pentobarbital from a compounding pharmacy to be used in a lethal dose for executions. It was first used in November 2013.

According to a December 2020 ProPublica article, by 2017 the federal Bureau of Prisons (BOP), in discussion with then Attorney General Jeff Sessions, had begun to search for suppliers of pentobarbital to be used in lethal injections. The BOP was aware that the use of pentobarbital as their "new drug choice" would be challenged in the courts because some lawyers had said that "pentobarbital would flood prisoners’ lungs with froth and foam, inflicting pain and terror akin to a death by drowning." BOP claimed that these concerns were unjustified and that their two expert witnesses asserted that the use of pentobarbital was "humane". On July 25, 2019, US Attorney General William Barr directed the federal government to resume capital punishment after 16 years. The federal protocol provides for intravenous administration of 2x2.5 grams of pentobarbital sodium.

Metabolism
Pentobarbital undergoes first-pass metabolism in the liver and possibly the intestines.

Drug interactions
Administration of ethanol, benzodiazepines, opioids, antihistamines, other sedative-hypnotics, and other central nervous system depressants will cause possible additive effects.

Chemistry
Pentobarbital is synthesized by methods analogous to that of amobarbital, the only difference being that the alkylation of α-ethylmalonic ester is carried out with 2-bromopentane in place of 1-bromo-3-methylbutane to give pentobarbital.

Pentobarbital can occur as a free acid, but is usually formulated as the sodium salt, pentobarbital sodium. The free acid is only slightly soluble in water and in ethanol while the sodium salt shows better solubility.

Society and culture
Pentobarbital is the INN, AAN, BAN, and USAN while pentobarbitone is a former AAN and BAN.

One brand name for this drug is Nembutal, coined by John S. Lundy, who started using it in 1930, from the structural formula of the sodium salt—Na (sodium) + ethyl + methyl + butyl + al (common suffix for barbiturates). Nembutal is trademarked and manufactured by the Danish pharmaceutical company Lundbeck (now produced by Akorn Pharmaceuticals) and is the only injectable form of pentobarbital approved for sale in the United States.

Abbott discontinued their Nembutal brand of pentobarbital capsules in 1999, largely replaced by the benzodiazepine family of drugs. Abbott's Nembutal, known on the streets as "yellow jackets", was widely abused.

See also 
 Animal euthanasia
 List of veterinary drugs

References

External links 
 

AMPA receptor antagonists
Barbiturates
CYP3A4 inducers
GABAA receptor positive allosteric modulators
Glycine receptor agonists
Hypnotics
Kainate receptor antagonists
Lethal injection components
Nicotinic antagonists
Sedatives